Kumoh National Institute of Technology (Acronym: KIT; Korean, 금오공과대학교, Kumoh Gonggwa Daehakgyo, colloquially KumohGongdae) is a national research and business development (R&BD) university in the Republic of Korea (South Korea). It is located in the South Korean industrial center of Gumi, Gyeongbuk province. The university is made up of 4 colleges (College of Engineering, College of Natural Sciences, College of Business administration, and College of Liberal Arts & Teacher Training). 18 out of the 21 undergraduate departments and 15 out of the 19 graduate departments are in the college of engineering. The university offers undergraduate, masters, and doctoral degrees.

Gallery

History
Kumoh National Institute of Technology was founded on December 31, 1979, by Park Chung-hee, the former President of South Korea. In 1987, a graduate school was established for both master and Ph.D. courses such as mechanical engineering, electronic engineering and civil engineering. KIT turned into a national institute in March 1990. On December 30, 2004, KIT moved to the new campus located in Yangho-dong. KIT is presently the only national university specialized for engineering in South Korea.

See also
List of national universities in South Korea
List of universities and colleges in South Korea
Education in Korea

References

External links
 Kumoh brochure
 Kumoh national Institute of Technology website
 금오공과대학교 홈페이지 (Korean site)(English site)

Universities and colleges in North Gyeongsang Province
Educational institutions established in 1979
National universities and colleges in South Korea
Gumi, North Gyeongsang
1979 establishments in South Korea